Clive Bramley (born 28 March 1976 in Ashbourne, England) is a sport shooter who represented Great Britain at the 2010 Commonwealth Games in Delhi where he won Bronze medal in the Skeet pairs event. He also participated in the men's skeet event, finishing for 5th position. he now runs a shotgun academy in Doveridge , Derbyshire and has two children and a wife

References

Commonwealth Games bronze medallists for England
English male sport shooters
Shooters at the 2006 Commonwealth Games
Shooters at the 2010 Commonwealth Games
Living people
1976 births
People from Ashbourne, Derbyshire
Sportspeople from Derbyshire
Commonwealth Games medallists in shooting
British male sport shooters
Medallists at the 2006 Commonwealth Games
Medallists at the 2010 Commonwealth Games